The Estadio Victoria de Girón is a multi-use stadium in Matanzas, Cuba.  It is currently used mostly for baseball games and is the home stadium of Matanzas Cocodrilos.  The stadium holds 22,000 and was built in 1977.

References

Baseball venues in Cuba
Buildings and structures in Matanzas
Sports venues completed in 1977
20th-century architecture in Cuba